A Dancehall Queen is a female celebrity in the musical genre called dancehall. She is known for her charisma, latest dance moves, and sexy fashion sense. The tradition originated in Jamaican dancehall parties in the ghettos, seeking the best local female dancer.  Each Jamaican parish holds a local dancehall queen competition annually, the most popular being the Dancehall Queen competition in Montego Bay.

Competition winners
 Dancehall Queen Carlene - Jamaica's first National Dancehall Queen

International Dancehall Queens 
 Dancehall Queen ?           Dancehall Queen Keisha Campbell
 Dancehall Queen 1999 - 2002 Dancehall Queen Stacey
 Dancehall Queen 2002 - 2003 Dancehall Queen Junko Kudō
 Dancehall Queen 2003 - 2004 Dancehall Queen Mad Michelle
 Dancehall Queen 2004 - 2005 Dancehall Queen Madd Lynn
 Dancehall Queen 2005 - 2006 Dancehall Queen Shanique Taylor
 Dancehall Queen 2006 - 2007 Dancehall Queen Shalara Gayle	
 Dancehall Queen 2007 - 2008 Dancehall Queen Mo Mo
 Dancehall Queen 2008 - 2009 Dancehall Queen Michelle Young
 Dancehall Queen 2009 - 2010 Dancehall Queen Tavia Morris
 Dancehall Queen 2010 - 2011 Dancehall Queen Kristal Anderson
 Dancehall Queen 2011 - 2012 Dancehall Queen Aneika Francis

References

External links
 Cooper, Carolyn (September 15, 2004). . London, UK: Palgrave Macmillan. 
Dancehall Queen fashion hits the catwalk, Jamaica Gleaner
July 25, 2003 article 'Dancehall Queen' goes international, Jamaica Gleaner
Dancehall keeps target on education
Men Who Dare To Dance, Jamaica Gleaner
Female dancers beg a 'bly' - Say men bombarding video light, Jamaica Star
 ( ー Harley Quinn from the movie 'Suicide Squad')

Dancehall